The year 2017 was the 25th year in the history of the Ultimate Fighting Championship (UFC), a mixed martial arts promotion based in the United States.

Title fights

The Ultimate Fighter
The following The Ultimate Fighter seasons are scheduled for broadcast in 2017:

Dana White's Contender Series

In May 2017, the UFC announced White would hold Dana White's Contender Series weekly on UFC Fight Pass. As with the earlier web series Looking for a Fight, the goal of the series is for White to scout talent for the UFC. Similar to The Ultimate Fighter none of the fighters involved will have existing UFC contracts. Licensed separately from the UFC with Dana White applying for a promoter's licence, it was stated ahead of the license being approved that “this is not the UFC, this is not the UFC brand, but instead a promotion that will allow up and coming fighters the chance to showcase their talents in hopes that one day they may compete in the UFC."

The inaugural event took take place on July 11, 2017 at the UFC's home base of Las Vegas.

Debuting UFC fighters

The following fighters fought their first UFC fight in 2017:

Abdul-Kerim Edilov
Adam Wieczorek
Aiemann Zahabi
Aleksandar Rakić
Alex Perez
Alex Reyes
Alexandre Pantoja
Allen Crowder
Amanda Lemos
Andre Soukhamthath
Ariel Beck
Arjan Bhullar
Ashkan Mokhtarian
Barb Honchak
Benito Lopez
Bharat Kandare
Bobby Nash
Brian Kelleher
Calvin Kattar
Carls John de Tomas
Chan-Mi Jeon
Christina Marks
Cindy Dandois
Cody Stamann
Cynthia Calvillo
Daniel Spitz
Daniel Teymur
Danny Henry
Davi Ramos
DeAnna Bennett
Deiveson Figueiredo
Desmond Green
Devin Powell
Dominick Reyes
Drakkar Klose
Emily Whitmire
Eryk Anders
Eric Shelton
Frank Camacho
Galore Bofando
Gavin Tucker
Gillian Robertson
Gina Mazany
Gökhan Saki
Hu Yaozong
Humberto Bandenay
James Bochnovic
Jared Gordon
Jeremy Kimball
Jessica Rose-Clark
Ji Yeon Kim
Jodie Esquibel
Joseph Morales
Julian Marquez
Júnior Albini
Justin Gaethje
Justin Willis
Kalindra Faria
Karine Gevorgyan
Karl Roberson
Lucie Pudilova
Luke Jumeau
Mads Burnell
Magomed Bibulatov
Mara Romero Borella
Marcel Fortuna
Marcelo Golm
Mark De La Rosa
Markus Perez
Michał Oleksiejczuk
Melinda Fábián
Merab Dvalishvili
Michel Quiñones
Mike Santiago 
Montana De La Rosa
Muslim Salikhov
Nadia Kassem
Naoki Inoue
Nasrat Haqparast
Nicco Montaño
Nick Roehrick
Oliver Enkamp
Oskar Piechota
Paulo Costa
Pearl Gonzalez
Poliana Botelho
Rashad Coulter
Rachael Ostovich
Ramazan Emeev
Ricardo Ramos
Rob Wilkinson
Roberto Sanchez
Rolando Dy
Terrion Ware
Trevin Giles
Salim Touahri
Sean O'Malley
Shana Dobson
Shane Young
Sheymon Moraes
Song Kenan
Song Yadong
Syuri Kondo
Tai Tuivasa
Talita Bernardo
Tom Duquesnoy
Tom Gallicchio
Volkan Oezdemir
Wang Guan
Wu Yunan
Wuliji Buren
Yan Xiaonan 
Zabit Magomedsharipov
Zu Anyanwu

Events list

See also
 UFC
 List of UFC champions
 List of UFC events
 List of current UFC fighters

References

External links
 UFC past events on UFC.com
 UFC events results at Sherdog.com

Ultimate Fighting Championship by year
2017 in mixed martial arts